The Selden Society is a learned society and registered charity concerned with the study of English legal history. It functions primarily as a text publication society, but also undertakes other activities to promote scholarship within its sphere of interest. It is the only learned society wholly devoted to the topic of English legal history.

The society takes its name from the eminent English jurist and legal and constitutional scholar, John Selden (1584–1654).

History and activities
The society was founded in 1887 by a group which included F. W. Maitland, who served as its first literary editor and personally edited eight volumes for the Society. The Society's first years were rocky: its treasurer, P. E. Dove, committed suicide in 1894, leaving behind a deficit of £1,000.

Its principal activity is publishing historical records of English law. Since its inception, a volume of significant texts has been published every year. It also publishes a supplementary series.

The current president is Nicholas Le Poidevin. The current literary director is Neil Jones, who succeeded Sir John Baker in this role in 2011. The secretary is Michael Lobban, Professor of Legal History at the London School of Economics. The society meets for an annual general meeting every year, and other meetings are held in the United States and Australia. It often collaborates with the Ames Foundation at Harvard Law School.

Membership of the society is open to anyone upon payment of a fee, and is primarily composed of educational institutions and interested individuals (mostly legal historians and lawyers).

Publications
Early volumes published by the society include:

This volume made use of record type, in an attempt to present the text in a near facsimile of the original manuscript sources. F. W. Maitland expressed reservations about the experiment, and it was not repeated.

Volumes published in recent years include:

 

 (2 vols)

Yale Prize
The David Yale Prize is awarded every other year to a young scholar (who has been engaged in research for no more than about 10 years) for an outstanding contribution to the laws and legal institutions of England and Wales. The award was set up in 1999 in honour of David Yale, FBA, Hon. Q.C., former President of the Selden Society. The prize has been awarded to:

1999 Thomas P. Gallanis for his article "The Rise of Modern Evidence Law"
2001 Daniel Klerman for his article "Settlement and the Decline of Private Prosecution in Thirteenth-Century England"
2003  Neil Jones for his article "The Use Upon a Use in Equity Revisited"
2007 Sara Elin Roberts for her book The Legal Triads of Medieval Wales (2007)
2013 Ian Williams
2017 Kenneth F. Duggan for his article "The Hue and Cry in Thirteenth-Century England" and Sean Bottomley for his book The English Patent System during the Industrial Revolution, 1700–1852 (2014) (joint winners)

References

Bibliography

External links 

1887 establishments in England
Legal history of England
Learned societies of the United Kingdom
History organisations based in London
Organizations established in 1887
Text publication societies
Queen Mary University of London